"Moon Hop" is a 1969 single by Derrick Morgan. Backed with the Reggaeites' "Harris Wheel", it reached #49 on the UK Singles Chart. The British Afro-Caribbean ska and reggae band Symarip covered "Moon Hop" as "Skinhead Moonstomp"; whilst unsuccessful on first release, in the wake of the 2 Tone revolution it was re-issued and charted at #54.

Background
"Moon Hop" was written to commemorate the July 20, 1969 landing of the Apollo Lunar Module on the moon. Symarip's version was released shortly afterwards and many see a strong similarity between the two. The Symarip version includes a vocal introduction: "I want all you skinheads to get up on your feet/Put your braces together and your boots on your feet/And give me some of that old moonstomping" which was based on Sam & Dave's "I Thank You.” The screeching guitar and lyrics were intended to appeal to skinheads. When released for the first time, Moonstomp sold 5,000 copies, and Symarip named their album after it.

Chart performance
"Moon Hop" was the first version to chart on the UK Singles Chart; backed with the Reggaeites' "Harris Wheel", it spent a week at #49 in January 1970. Although Symarip's version didn't chart on first release, it was re-released ten years later in 1980 in the wake of the 2 Tone revolution, and spent three weeks on the UK Singles Chart in 1980.

References

1969 singles
1980 singles
1969 songs
The Specials songs